Fujisaki (written: 藤崎 or 藤嵜) is a Japanese surname. Notable people with the surname include:

, Japanese diplomat
, Japanese manga artist
Satoshi Fujisaki, Japanese mixed martial artist
, Japanese footballer
, Japanese footballer
, Japanese footballer

Fictional characters
, a character in the visual novel Danganronpa
, a character in the manga series Shugo Chara!
, protagonist of the visual novel Tokimeki Memorial
, protagonist of the manga series Sket Dance

Japanese-language surnames